General O'Neil or O'Neill may refer to:

Archie E. O'Neil (1905–1986), U.S. Marine Corps brigadier general
David F. O'Neill (1904–1963), U.S. Marine Corps major general
Edward J. O'Neill (general) (1902–1979), U.S. Army lieutenant general
Jack O'Neill fictional U.S. Air Force lieutenant general in Stargate media
James Hugh O'Neill (1892–1972), U.S. Army brigadier general
John E. O'Neil IV (fl. 1980s–2020s), U.S. Army brigadier general
Joseph P. O'Neil (1863–1938), U.S. Army brigadier general
Malcolm Ross O'Neill (born 1940), U.S. Army lieutenant general
Mark J. O'Neil (born 1964), U.S. Army major general
Owen Roe O'Neill (c. 1585–1649), Ulster Army general
Ralph Ambrose O'Neill (1896–1980), Mexican American Air Force brigadier general